Eric Denis better known as Eric "Roach" Denis is a Canadian documentary film maker and activist whose films deal with social justice, and particularly homelessness.

Earlier Life
Denis was born in Grenville, Quebec. At age 9, his parents divorced and he went on to live with his mother in Hawkesbury, Ontario. After a brief stay with his father, he was put in a juvenile detention centre because he had been hooked on smoking marijuana. At the age of 14, he escaped from the center he was assigned to and started living as a street kid in the streets of Montreal acquiring addiction to hard drugs in the process as a teenager.

Denis assuming the pseudonym "Roach" became a squeegee teenager sleeping in parks, abandoned cars and refuge centers and was arrested many times. It was during these troubled times that he met EyeSteelFilm's director Daniel Cross who was planning to shoot a documentary film about squeegees and Roach offered to tell his part of the story by film thus beginning his career as a documentary filmmaker and activist.

Movie career
Denis began first by documenting his own life as an autobiography, entitled "RoachCam" as part of the acclaimed S.P.I.T.: Squeegee Punks in Traffic directed by Daniel Cross and Mila Aung-Thwin.

Using cinema as a motivation to get cleaned up, "Roach" has gone on to make two other films with EyeSteelFilm: RoachTrip is his directorial debut film. It is autobiographical take about the invisible punk highway from Quebec to the orchards of British Columbia. In August 2004, the film went on to win the second prize in the "Portraits" category" in Tver festival in Russia.

He recently directed Punk the Vote!, again an autobiographical documentary which saw Roach and fellow punker Starbuck run for Canadian federal elections against Liberal incumbent Jean Lapierre, in an informative, hilarious take on Canadian politics punk-rock style. Eric Denis didn't win the election. Roach had 101 votes. His main goal in this film was to give the homeless the opportunity to vote.

From his works also is the short film ZLEA: Zone Libre d'Expression Anarchiste (translated as Free Zone for Anarchist Expression) in 2005.

Denis' films have played in festivals such as Hot Docs Canadian International Documentary Festival, in Tver (Russia), DocsDF (Mexico City) and Nemo (Paris).

Tickets is about the police tactic of issuing large numbers of minor infractions against homeless people in order to “evict” them from public areas, eventually relocating them to prison. This new film examines the social, financial and human cost of criminalizing Montreal's homeless community. By following this issue from the Ministry of Justice, to the streets, and finally to prison, the film aims to investigate what is happening to the rights of society's already alienated street community. It was shown at Festival du Nouveau Cinema, FICFA, RVCQ and other festivals. Denis has also did some conferences on the subject around the province of Quebec.

Filmography 
S.P.I.T.: Squeegee Punks in Traffic
RoachTrip
Punk the Vote!
 ZLEA: Zone Libre d'Expression Anarchiste
 Les Tickets

See also
Punk the Vote!
RoachTrip
S.P.I.T.: Squeegee Punks in Traffic

Electoral record

Source: Official Results, Elections Canada and Financial Returns, Elections Canada.

References

External links

RoachCam official site

EyeSteelFilm
Canadian documentary film directors
Film directors from Montreal
Franco-Ontarian people
Living people
People from Hawkesbury, Ontario
Punk filmmakers
Year of birth missing (living people)